The Green Party of Colorado (GPCO) is the affiliate of the Green Party of the United States for the state of Colorado.

Overview
The Green Party of Colorado first attempted to qualify for statewide ballot status in 1994. While the party was unsuccessful in gaining ballot access, the party did qualify for Qualified Political Organization status. This made it possible to register as a Green in Colorado.

The Green Party of Colorado qualified for statewide ballot status in July 1998 and has retained its ballot status ever since.

In 2000 the Green Party of Colorado hosted the 2000 national convention of the Green Party of the United States in Denver.

In the 2006 mid-term elections Tom Kelly running for U.S. House of Representatives District 1 received 20.2% of the vote, the best finish of any Green running for Congress in 2006.

In 2016, the party's candidate for president was Dr. Jill Stein.

Elected officials
Current public officeholders:

Merrily Mazza, City Council, Lafayette
Bryan Williams, Director School Board District R-1, Ouray County
Becky Elder, Councillor, City of Manitou Springs

Former public officeholders:

Art Goodtimes, Board of Commissioners (San Miguel County)
Scott Chaplin, Board of Trustees, Carbondale
Jeffery Bergeron, Town Council, Breckenridge (Summit County)
Wendy Mimiaga, Town Board, Dolores (Cortez County)
Matt Keefauver, Town Council, Cortez (Montezuma County)
Charlie Green, School Board, District E, Fremont RE-3
Peter Gleichman, Mayor, Ward, CO (Boulder County)
Tanya Ishikawa, Federal Heights City Council, Ward I
Michelle Haynes, Town Board, Norwood
Andrea Mérida Cuéllar, Denver Board of Education, Denver Public Schools District 2

Active Chapters/Caucuses

Adams County Green Party
Arapahoe County Green Party
Denver Green Party
Poudre Valley Green Party
Mesa County Green Party
Longmont Green Party
Youth Caucus
Latinx Caucus
Formerly-Incarcerated Persons Caucus

References

External links
Green Party of Colorado (Official site)

Green Party
C
Political parties in Colorado
State and local socialist parties in the United States